Deepwater Nautilus is an ultra-deepwater, semi-submersible offshore drilling rig.

Built in 2000 in South Korea, she is owned by Transocean, registered in Vanuatu, and currently leased to Petronas at the rate of $140,000 per day for drilling operations in Malaysia.

Description
Deepwater Nautilus is a fifth-generation, RBS-8M design, ultra-deepwater, column-stabilized, semi-submersible mobile offshore drilling unit, designed to drill subsea wells for oil exploration and production.

She was designed by Reading & Bates RBS-8M and built by Hyundai Heavy Industries in 2000 at the Ulsan shipyard in South Korea.

History

Drilling

In 2002, Deepwater Nautilus discovered oil at the Shell-operated Great White oil field in Alaminos Canyon block 813.

In the same year, the new record was set at  while drilling at the Alaminos Canyon block 813.

In March 2009, Deepwater Nautilus discovered oil at the Appomattox prospect in Mississippi Canyon blocks 391 and 392.

Incidents
In 2004, at the time of Hurricane Ivan Deepwater Nautilus broke free from its location.

In 2005, as a result of Hurricane Katrina Deepwater Nautilus had drifted off location. All personnel had been safely evacuated before the approach of the storm.

Less than a month later, Deepwater Nautilus broke free during Hurricane Rita.

References

2000 ships
Drilling rigs
Semi-submersibles
Ships of Panama
Ships built by Hyundai Heavy Industries Group
Transocean